Whited Inlet is an ice-filled inlet along the coast between Northrup Head and Anderson Peninsula. Mapped by United States Geological Survey (USGS) from surveys and U.S. Navy air photos, 1960–63. Named by Advisory Committee on Antarctic Names (US-ACAN) for Master Chief Quartermaster Robert J. Whited, U.S. Navy, Leading Chief for the staff and a member of Operations Division responsible for maintaining and updating charts for Task Force 43 during Operation Deep Freeze 1968 and 1969.

Inlets of Antarctica
Landforms of Victoria Land
Pennell Coast